Rinson Lau Wing Sang (born 15 September 1999 in Hong Kong) is a former Hong Kong professional footballer who played as a defender.

Club career
In 2018, Lau started his senior career with Hong Kong Premier League club Hoi King, where he made 10 league appearances.

In the 2019–20 season, he joined Southern.

On 19 October 2020, it was announced that Lau had signed for Lee Man.

References

External links
 HKFA

1999 births
Living people
Hong Kong footballers
Association football defenders
Hong Kong First Division League players
Hong Kong Premier League players
Hoi King SA players
Southern District FC players
Lee Man FC players